Yo is a slang interjection, commonly associated with  North American English. It  was popularized by the Italian-American community in  Philadelphia, Pennsylvania, in the 1940s.

Although often used as a greeting and often deployed at the beginning of a sentence, yo may also come at the end of a sentence and/or may be used to place emphasis on or to direct focus onto a particular individual, group, or issue at hand, or to gain the attention of another individual or group. It may also be used to express excitement, disbelief, enthusiasm, or amazement.

Etymology and history
The interjection yo was first used in Middle English. In addition to yo, it was also sometimes written io.

Though the term may have been in use in the 16th century, its current popularity stems from its use in Philadelphia's Italian American population in the twentieth century, which spread to other ethnic groups in the city, notably among Philadelphia African Americans, and later spread beyond Philadelphia.

From the late twentieth century, it frequently appeared in hip hop music and became associated with African American Vernacular English, as seen in the title Yo! MTV Raps, a popular American television hip-hop music program in the late 1980s.

Notable uses
A frequent example of the expression is fictional Philadelphian Italian-American Rocky Balboa, where the word is used throughout all of the Rocky films and is part of the iconic line, "Yo, Adrian, I did it!", which was ranked 80th in the AFI's list of 100 best movie quotes.

The phrase "Yo, Blair. What are you doing?" was supposedly an informal greeting that United States President George W. Bush gave to British prime minister Tony Blair during the G8 summit in Saint Petersburg, Russia, on July 17, 2006. However, other sources state that Bush’s usage of the word "yo" is a “myth” and that the president actually said "Yeah, Blair".

Other uses

 In Baltimore, and possibly other cities, yo (or a word coincidentally identical to it) has become a gender-neutral pronoun.

References

1990s slang
African-American culture
American slang
Culture of Philadelphia
Greeting words and phrases
Interjections
Italian-American history
Italian-American culture
English words
Hip hop terminology